This is complete works by American fantasy writer Roland J. Green.

Bibliography

Wandor series
 Wandor's Ride (1973) 
 Wandor's Journey (1975) 
 Wandor's Voyage (1979) 
 Wandor's Flight (1981)

Conan (shared universe)
 Conan the Valiant (1988)
 Conan the Guardian (1991)
 Conan the Relentless (1992)
 Conan and the Gods of the Mountain (1993)
 Conan at the Demon's Gate (1994)
 Conan and the Mists of Doom (1995)
 Conan and the Death Lord of Thanza (1997)

Dragonlance Warriors (shared universe)
 Knights of the Crown (1995)
 Knights of the Sword (1995)
 Knights of the Rose (1996)
 The Wayward Knights (1997)

Peace Company
 Peace Company (1985) 
 These Green Foreign Hills (1987) 
 The Mountain Walks (1989)

Starcruiser Shenandoah
 Squadron Alert (1989) 
 Division of the Spoils (1990) 
 The Sum of Things (1991) 
 Vain Command (1992) 
 The Painful Field (1993) 
 Warriors for the Working Day (1994)

Janissaries series
 Janissaries II: Clan and Crown (1982) (with Jerry Pournelle) 
 Janissaries III: Storms of Victory (1987) (with Jerry Pournelle) 
 Tran (1996) (with Jerry Pournelle) (omnibus of the two novels above, the second and third in the Janissaries series) 
 Lord of Janissaries (2015) (with Jerry Pournelle)

Richard Blade series
Green wrote books 9-29, 31-37 of the Richard Blade series (as by "Jeffrey Lord"). The series was published by Pinnacle Books using the house pseudonym.
 Kingdom of Royth (1974) 
 Ice Dragon (1974) 
 Dimension of Dreams (1974) 
 King of Zunga (1975) 
 The Golden Steed (1975) 
 The Temples of Ayocan (1975) 
 The Towers of Melnon (1975) 
 The Crystal Seas (1975) 
 The Mountains of Brega (1976) 
 Warlords Of Gaikon (1976) 
 Looters of Tharn (1976) 
 Guardians Of The Coral Throne (1976) 
 Champion of the Gods (1976) 
 The Forests of Gleor (1976) 
 Empire of Blood (1977) 
 The Dragons of Englor (1977) 
 The Torian Pearls (1977) 
 City of the Living Dead (1978) 
 Master of the Hashomi (1978) 
 Wizard of Rentoro (1978) 
 Treasure of the Stars (1978) 
 Gladiators of Hapanu (1979) 
 Pirates Of Gohar (1979) 
 Killer Plants Of Binnark (1980) 
 The Ruins of Kaldac (1981) 
 The Lords of the Crimson River (1981) 
 Return to Kaldak (1983) 
 Warriors of Latan (1984)

Other novels
 Jamie the Red (1984) (with Gordon R. Dickson) 
 Assignment - Hellhole (1983) (with Andrew J. Offutt [as by "John Cleve"]) Book 14 in the "Spaceways" series
 The Book of Kantela (1985) (with Frieda A. Murray) 
 Great Kings' War (1985) (with John F. Carr) the sequel to Lord Kalvan of Otherwhen by H. Beam Piper
 The Tale of the Comet (1997) In the Fantastic Adventures series.  
 On the Verge (1998) 
 Voyage to Eneh (2000)

Anthologies
 Women at War (1995) (with Lois McMaster Bujold)  
 Alternate Generals (1998) (with Martin H. Greenberg and Harry Turtledove) 
 (with Harry Turtledove)
 Worlds of Honor (1999) (short story Deck Load Strike)

Short stories
 She Who Might Be Obeyed, with Frieda A. Murray (1995) (collected in John Varley's anthology Superheroes)
 "Enchanter Kiev" (1995) with Frieda A. Murray
 "Chozzerai" (1996) with Frieda A. Murray
 "To Speak with Men and Angels" (1996) with Frieda A. Murray
 The King of Poland's Foot Cavalry (1997) (collected in Mike Resnick's alternate history anthology Alternate Tyrants)
 George Patton Slept Here (2002) (collected in Harry Turtledove's anthology Alternate Generals II)
 It Isn't Every Day of the Week (2005) (collected in Harry Turtledove's anthology Alternate Generals III)

References

Bibliographies by writer
Bibliographies of American writers
Fantasy bibliographies